Mastacembelus plagiostomus is a species of fish in the family Mastacembelidae. It is found in shallow waters with rock substrates and is endemic to Lake Tanganyika. It grows to  standard length.

References

plagiostomus
Fish of Lake Tanganyika
Taxonomy articles created by Polbot
Fish described in 1962
Taxa named by Hubert Matthes